Miriam Hopkins: Life and Films of a Hollywood Rebel is a 2017 non-fiction book published by the University of Kentucky Press and written by Allan R. Ellenberger concerning the actress Miriam Hopkins.

Background
It is a part of the Press Screen Classic series documenting films with some relationship to the state. Ellenberger had researched the subject for around a decade. He had previously conversed with the Hopkins' son, Michael.

Reception
Melinda Mathews, a library employee of the University of Louisiana at Monroe, wrote that the book is "perfect for public and academic libraries."

Dan Callahan wrote in Sight and Sound that despite the author's research focus, the tone is done "unenthusiastically at times, and without any real insight to either her work or her personality" despite the "fair amount of new information" present. Callahan concluded that "this is a book that leaves more questions about Hopkins than answers".

References

2017 non-fiction books
American biographies
Books about actors
University Press of Kentucky books